The Future Aircraft Technology Enhancements (FATE) program is a program to develop new technologies. It is being run by the Air Force Research Laboratory (AFRL) and the Defense Advanced Research Projects Agency (DARPA). The X-39 aircraft designation is reserved for use with FATE by the USAF.

References
Battle Of The X-Planes
Future Aircraft Technology

X-39